Narach is a resort town in Myadzyel District, Minsk Region, Belarus, by the Lake Narach.

It was established in 1964 in place of the former village Kupa.

References

Urban-type settlements in Belarus
Populated places in Minsk Region
Myadzyel District
Sventsyansky Uyezd
Wilno Voivodeship (1926–1939)